Mykyta Ruslanovych Shevchenko (born 26 January 1993) is a Ukrainian professional footballer who plays as a goalkeeper for Zorya Luhansk in the Ukrainian Premier League.

Career
Shevchenko has been a member of different Ukrainian national youth football teams. He was called up as a member of the Ukraine national under-18 football team by coach Oleh Kuznetsov in the summer of 2010, but did not play in any games.

Shevchenko was named as part of the senior Ukraine squad for UEFA Euro 2016.

Honours

Club
Shakhtar
Ukrainian Premier League: 2012–13, 2016–17, 2017–18
Ukrainian Cup: 2012–13, 2016–17, 2017–18
Ukrainian Super Cup: 2012, 2017

Career statistics

Club

References

External links 

Ukrainian footballers
Ukraine under-21 international footballers
Ukraine youth international footballers
People from Horlivka
FC Shakhtar Donetsk players
FC Mariupol players
FC Zorya Luhansk players
Association football goalkeepers
Ukrainian Premier League players
1993 births
Living people
UEFA Euro 2016 players
FC Karpaty Lviv players
Sportspeople from Donetsk Oblast